Roger Fan (born August 11, 1972) is a Taiwanese-American film, theater, and television actor best known for his collaborations with Justin Lin and his appearances in the films Annapolis, Finishing the Game and Better Luck Tomorrow.

Background

Fan, a Taiwanese American, was born in Baltimore, Maryland and raised in Southern California, growing up in Upland, California, a suburb of Los Angeles. He graduated from the Webb Schools of California and also graduated with a degree in economics from Brown University. He initially worked on Wall Street and in San Francisco as a financial consultant, but spent his off time acting in theatre.

Career

Fan is likely most known for his role as Daric Loo in Justin Lin's seminal Asian American film, Better Luck Tomorrow (2002). He also appeared as Bruce Lee's rival "Breeze Loo" in Lin's Finishing the Game (2007). Fan has also appeared in Lin's Annapolis as Loo, and in Lin's Fast & Furious as an FBI Agent.

Fan has also appeared in the films Drillbit Taylor (2008) (as Bodyguard with Knives), Jessica Yu's Ping Pong Playa (2007) (as Michael Wang, the brother of Jimmy Tsai's character), Corky Romano (2001) (as Agent Bob Cox), Gene Rhee's The Trouble with Romance (2007) (as Jimmy) and Rush Hour (as Soo Yung's bodyguard).

Fan has also appeared on the TV shows Arli$$ (as Comet), Party of Five, NewsRadio (as Orderly), Martial Law (as Johnny Lao), Frasier (as Waiter), Bull (as Woo), ER, Karaoke Nights (as Irving), American Dad!, and the web series Easy to Assemble.

Fan has also appeared in Judy Soo Hoo's play Solve for X for the Next Stage Festival at the Cleveland Playhouse, opposite Kelvin Han Yee and Elaine Kao.

Filmography
The following is a list of Fan's filmography:
Rush Hour (1998)...Soo Yung's Bodyguard
Backyard Dogs (2000)...Rick
Corky Romano (2001)...Agent Bob Cox
Better Luck Tomorrow (2002)...Daric Loo
Stuck On You (2003)...Executive #1
D.E.B.S. (2004)...News Anchor #1
Annapolis (2006)...Loo
Finishing the Game (2007)...Breeze Loo
The Trouble With Romance (2007) (post-production)...Jimmy
Ping Pong Playa (2007)...Michael Wang
Drillbit Taylor (2008)...Bodyguard with Knives
Fast & Furious (2009)...Agent Daric Loo / FBI Agent #3
The King of Fighters (2010)
Hollywood Adventures (2015)...Agent Li (Chinese debut)

References

External links
Roger Fan blog
Roger Fan - Official MySpace Site
 
Twitch Film Review
Interview with Roger Fan
Roger Fan Enrolls In "Annapolis"
Roger Fan - Loving Every Minute Of It!

1972 births
Male actors from California
American male film actors
American male television actors
American male actors of Taiwanese descent
Brown University alumni
Male actors from Baltimore
Living people